Lopharcha is a genus of moths belonging to the family Tortricidae.

Species
Lopharcha amethystas  Meyrick, 1912
Lopharcha angustior  Diakonoff, 1941
Lopharcha chalcophanes  Meyrick, 1931
Lopharcha chionea  Diakonoff, 1974
Lopharcha conia  Diakonoff, 1983
Lopharcha cryptacantha  Diakonoff, 1974
Lopharcha curiosa  Meyrick, 1908
Lopharcha deliqua  Diakonoff, 1974
Lopharcha ditissima  Diakonoff, 1974
Lopharcha erioptila  Meyrick, 1912
Lopharcha halidora  Meyrick, 1908
Lopharcha herbaecolor  Diakonoff, 1941
Lopharcha insolita  Dugdale, 1966
Lopharcha iriodis  Diakonoff, 1976
Lopharcha kinokuniana Nasu, 2008
Lopharcha kopeci  Razowski, 1992
Lopharcha maurognoma  Diakonoff, 1974
Lopharcha moriutii  Nasu, 2006
Lopharcha orthioterma  Diakonoff, 1941
Lopharcha psathyra  Diakonoff, 1989
Lopharcha quinquestriata  Diakonoff, 1941
Lopharcha rapax  Meyrick, 1908
Lopharcha siderota  Meyrick, 1918

References

 , 1941, Treubia 18: 424.

External links
tortricidae.com

 
Polyorthini
Tortricidae genera
Taxa named by Alexey Diakonoff